The 2019–20 Ukrainian First League is the 29th since its establishment.

The competition began on 27 July 2019 with eight matches of Round 1, and went into recess for a winter break which started after the completion of Round 19 on 24 November 2019. The competition was to be resumed on 22 March 2020 and was expected to end 23 May 2020. However, on 17 March 2020 the Ukrainian Association of Football adopted the decision to pause all football competitions in the country since 18 March 2020 for unspecified period of time (until adoption of the next decision to resume all football events) due to the COVID-19 pandemic.

On 11 June 2020, the PFL Extraordinary Conference took the decision to resume the competition starting from 24 June with the conclusion on 11 August 2020. Additionally, the league will be expanded to 18 teams starting from the next season. Later the last day of competition was extended due to some unforeseen circumstances (see below for details).

The Video assistant referee (VAR) position was implemented in the league starting from the round 25, with the game between Obolon-Brovar Kyiv and Rukh Lviv the first to use it on 20 July 2020.

Summary
On 6 June 2019 the PFL Council of leagues presented its plan draft ("contours") for the next season for both its First and its Second leagues. The final decision for the season was to be adopted at the next 27th PFL Conference which was scheduled for 27 June 2019.

For the next from 2020 to 2021 season, Ukrainian First League will expand to 18 teams. The bottom two team from Ukrainian First League will battle relegation play-off to Ukrainian Second League. The top two teams of each group from Ukrainian Second League will gain promotion to Ukrainian First League next season. However, the third place team from Ukrainian Second League of each group will battle promotion play-off to Ukrainian First League.

Revival of competitions and administrative crisis
On 21 May 2020, the PFL council of leagues at its open-air session at Obolon Arena adopted decision to end competitions in the Second League, while competitions in the First League were placed on hold as some clubs were against to renew the season and no consensus was reached. In addition to issues with restart of competitions in the First League, FC Inhulets Petrove accused the Professional Football League in wrong interpretation of the season's regulation in placement of teams with the same number of points ("head-to-head tiebreak"). Earlier the president of Inhulets expressed its thoughts that the Ukrainian PFL should be dissolved and both its First and Second leagues added to the Ukrainian Premier League. While some clubs insisted to continue the competitions from where they were left off, there were clubs that recommended to abandon the competitions and reset them by starting anew without rotation of teams between tiers. Among the latter clubs was MFC Mykolaiv.

On 29 May 2020, an information has leaked that competitions are expected to resume on 23 June 2020. On 5 June 2020 another meeting of the PFL council of leagues approved resuming competitions in the First League (Persha Liha) starting on 23 June 2020 and made some adjustments to its season regulations among which it was decided to expand the league for the next season to 18 teams (from 16 currently) and therefore the relegation zone was removed, but the last two teams are expected to play-off with the two third placed teams out of the Second League (Druha Liha). The final decision in that regard is expected to be adopted at the next UAF Executive Committee meeting on 7 June 2020. The UAF Executive Committee postponed with its decision and asked the PFL to call for its conference on 11 June where it is expected to confirm the PFL's decision about next season and check if it is possible to resume competitions in both its divisions. The UAF Executive Committee also confirmed that the First League junior tournament is discontinued. The UAF President Pavelko also urged referee to prepare for the current season.

On 27 July 2020 24 out of 34 PFL clubs expressed their vote of no confidence to the PFL president Serhiy Makarov. On 5 August 2020 took place another PFL Council of leagues which ended in scandal and resignation of the PFL president Makarov. In opinion of the PFL, the meeting's main task was a deliberate disruption of the First League (Persha Liha) competitions.

Situation with promotions
On 9 July 2020, the president of Ahrobiznes Oleh Sobutskyi announced that his club will not apply on certification for the Ukrainian Premier League due to inadequate conditions of the club's stadium. Similarly, back in the 2012–13 and 2013–14 FC Oleksandriya and FC Stal Alchevsk were also refusing to be promoted on various pretenses. Yet, back in the 2016–17 NK Veres Rivne was promoted ahead of FC Desna Chernihiv, because supposedly the Chernihiv club did not have adequate home stadium, yet Veres that is based in Rivne after promotion played in Lviv. On 9 July 2020 on the Sobutskyi's announcement, the Ukrainian PFL sports director Yevhen Moroz commented not to jump to conclusion considering that the UAF awards certifications depending on situation recalling couple of other examples. On 24 July 2020, the UAF Control and Disciplinary Committee (CDC) issued an official warning to the PFL sports director for his comment which "damages image of the Association and the Ukrainian football in general".

Teams

Promoted teams 
The following teams have been promoted from the 2018–19 Ukrainian Second League:
 FC Mynai – first place of the 2018–19 Ukrainian Second League Group A (debut)
 Cherkashchyna-Akademiya Biloziria – second place of the 2018–19 Ukrainian Second League Group A, play-off win (returning after a season, previously competed as Cherkaskyi Dnipro competed in the 2017–18 season)
 Kremin Kremenchuk – first place of the 2018–19 Ukrainian Second League Group B (returning after a season)
 Metalurh Zaporizhya – second place of the 2018–19 Ukrainian Second League Group B, play-off defeat, but later promoted (debut, however another club named as Metalurh Zaporizhya competed in the 2011–12 season)

Relegated teams 
The following teams have been relegated from the 2018–19 Ukrainian Premier League:
 Chornomorets Odesa – 11th place of the 2018–19 Ukrainian Premier League, play-off defeat (returns after 8 seasons)

Reformed/reorganized teams 
 FC Rukh Vynnyky has officially relocated to Lviv and reformed as FC Rukh Lviv. Those changes were approved by the 27th PFL Conference.
 FC Cherkashchyna-Akademiya Biloziria was reorganized again as FC Cherkashchyna and moved back to Cherkasy. During winter break the senior team was abandoned by its owners and taken over by Football Federation of Cherkasy Oblast to avoid withdrawal of the club mid season.

Withdrawn teams 
 Arsenal Kyiv – 12th place of the 2018–19 Ukrainian Premier League, was originally relegated, but later withdraw from the First League. Arsenal Kyiv was replaced by Metalurh Zaporizhya that lost promotional play-offs to Ahrobiznes.

Location map 
The following displays the location of teams.

Stadiums 
The following stadiums are considered home grounds for the teams in the competition.

Managers

Managerial changes 
{| class="wikitable sortable"
|-
!Team
!Outgoing head coach
!Manner of departure
!Date of vacancy
!Table
!Incoming head coach
!Date of appointment
!Table
|-
| Metalist 1925 Kharkiv
|  Oleksandr Horyainov
| Sacked
| 4 June 2019
| rowspan=4| Pre-season
|  Andriy Demchenko
| 19 June 2019
| rowspan=4| Pre-season
|-
| Metalurh Zaporizhya
|  Oleh Taran
| Resigned
| 13 June 2019
|  Ivan Bohatyr
| 25 June 2019
|-
| Ahrobiznes Volochysk
|  Andriy Donets
| 
| 15 June 2019
|  Ostap Markevych
| 15 June 2019
|-
| FC Mynai
|  Kirill Kurenko
| Mutual consent
| 18 June 2019
|  Vasyl Kobin
| 19 June 2019
|-
| Cherkashchyna Cherkasy
|  Oleksandr Kyrylyuk
| Resigned
| 5 September 2019
| 13th
|  Vitaliy Kobzar (interim)
| 5 September 2019
| 13th
|-
| rowspan=2|Hirnyk-Sport Horishni Plavni
|  Volodymyr Mazyar
| Mutual consent, health issues,signed with FC Lviv
| 9 September 2019
| 14th
|  Roman Pasichnychenko (interim)
| 15 September 2019
| 14th
|-
|  Roman Pasichnychenko (interim)
| End of interim
| 16 September 2019
| 12th
|  Ihor Zhabchenko
| 16 September 2019
| 12th
|-
| Chornomorets Odesa
|  Angel Chervenkov
| Resigned
| 16 September 2019
| 10th
|  Vitaliy Starovik (interim)
| 16 September 2019
| 10th
|-
| Kremin Kremenchuk
|  Ihor Stolovytskyi
| Resigned
| 17 September 2019
| 14th
|  Volodymyr Prokopynenko (interim)
| 17 September 2019
| 14th
|-
| Ahrobiznes Volochysk
|  Ostap Markevych
| Mutual Consent
| 6 October 2019
| 7th
|  Oleksandr Ivanov (interim)
| 6 October 2019
| 7th
|-
| Metalurh Zaporizhya
|  Ivan Bohatyr
| Mutual Consent
| 7 October 2019
| 16th
|  Oleksiy Hodin (interim)
| 7 October 2019
| 16th
|-
| MFC Mykolaiv
|  Serhiy Shyshchenko
| Sacked
| 12 October 2019<ref name=Shyshchenko_fired>Yuriy Samotkan. Serhiy Shyshchenko left "Mykolaiv" (Сергей Шищенко покинул "Николаев"). Footboom. 12 October 2019</ref>
| 12th
|  Yuriy Chaus (interim)
| 16 October 2019
| 12th
|-
| Chornomorets Odesa
|  Vitaliy Starovik (interim)
| End of interim
| 14 October 2019
| 11th
|  Ostap Markevych
| 14 October 2019
| 11th
|-
| Cherkashchyna Cherkasy
|  Vitaliy Kobzar (interim)
| End of interim
| 25 October 2019
| 15th
|  Oleksandr Kyrylyuk
| 25 October 2019
| 15th
|-
| Ahrobiznes Volochysk
|  Oleksandr Ivanov (interim)
| End of interim
| 6 December 2019
| 6th
|  Oleksandr Chyzhevskyi
| 10 December 2019
| 15th
|-
| MFC Mykolaiv
|  Yuriy Chaus (interim)
| End of interim spell
| 9 December 2019
| 12th
|  Illya Blyznyuk 
| 13 January 2020
| 12th
|-
| Rukh Lviv
|  Leonid Kuchuk
| Mutual consent
| 10 December 2019
| 1st
|  Yuriy Bakalov
| 14 December 2019
| 1st
|-
| Obolon-Brovar Kyiv
|  Serhiy Kovalets 
| Mutual consent
| 9 January 2020
| 5th
|  Oleh Mazurenko 
| 13 January 2020
| 5th
|-
| rowspan=2|Kremin Kremenchuk
|  Volodymyr Prokopynenko (interim)
| End of interim
| 3 February 2020
| rowspan=2|13th
|  Volodymyr Prokopynenko 
| 3 February 2020
| rowspan=2|13th
|-
|  Volodymyr Prokopynenko
| Resigned
| 10 February 2020
|  Serhiy Svystun 
| 10 February 2020
|-
| Chornomorets Odesa
|  Ostap Markevych
| Mutual Consent
| April 2020
| 10th
|  Serhiy Kovalets 
| 13 May 2020
| 10th
|-
| Rukh Lviv
|  Yuriy Bakalov
| Resigned (health concerns) 
| 15 June 2020
| 1st
|  Ivan Fedyk
| 16 June 2020
| 1st
|-
| Obolon-Brovar Kyiv
|  Oleh Mazurenko 
| Took time off
| 8 July 2020
| 7th
|  Valeriy Ivashchenko (interim)
| 8 July 2020
| 7th
|-
| Metalist 1925 Kharkiv
|  Andriy Demchenko 
| Mutual consent
| 21 July 2020
| 7th
|  Vyacheslav Khruslov (interim)
| 21 July 2020
| 7th
|-
| Avanhard Kramatorsk
|  Oleksandr Kosevych 
| Undisclosed
| 10 August 2020
| 8th
|  Oleksiy Horodov (interim)
| 11 August 2020
| 8th
|-
|}Notes: League table 

 Position by round 

 Results 

Relegation play-offs
The relegation–promotion play-off games are scheduled to take place between the last two places (15th and 16th) of the First League with the third places from both groups of the Second League. On 28 July 2020, there took place a draw of the PFL play-offs in two legs format (each team plays at home and away) with games scheduled to take place on August 15 and 19. On 7 August 2020 the PFL administration announced that dates for promotion/relegation playoffs were shifted by one day.
First leg

Second leg

Veres Rivne won 3–1 on aggregate and was promoted to the 2020–21 Ukrainian First League 

Alians Lypova Dolyna won 3–0 on aggregate and was promoted to the 2020–21 Ukrainian First League

Following the play-offs, the fate of both Cherkashchyna and Metalurh was postponed to be determined at the PFL Conference the next day due to elimination of Karpaty Lviv and expression of interest by Balkany to be demoted.Artur Malkin. Andrei Parkhomenko: Financial situation of "Balkany" does not allow to compete in the First League (Андрей Пархоменко: "Финансовое положение "Балкан" не позволяет продолжить выступление в первой лиге"). Footboom. 19 August 2020

 Top goalscorers Notes: Players who scored for two teams from the same league have both teams mentioned.

 Awards 
 Monthly awards 

 Round awards Notes:''
 After the winter break and its extension due to the COVID-19, the PFL also started to publicize several additional league's awards, among which are best goalkeeper, best rookie, best substitution ("round joker"), and round goal.

Number of teams by region

Attendance
According to research by the Ukrainian website SportArena the official reported attendance in the league could be inaccurate if not completely wrong.

See also
 2019–20 Ukrainian Premier League
 2019–20 Ukrainian Second League
 2019–20 Ukrainian Football Amateur League
 2019–20 Ukrainian Cup
 List of Ukrainian football transfers summer 2019
 List of Ukrainian football transfers winter 2019–20

References 

Ukrainian First League seasons
2019–20 in Ukrainian association football leagues
Ukraine
Ukrainian